Henry Lee Burns (born March 2, 1947) is former Louisiana politician who served in the Louisiana House of Representatives.

References

Living people
1947 births
Members of the Louisiana House of Representatives
Louisiana Democrats
Louisiana Republicans
People from Shongaloo, Louisiana
Politicians from Bossier City, Louisiana
American food industry businesspeople
Businesspeople from Louisiana
American racehorse owners and breeders
School board members in Louisiana
United States Army officers
Northwestern State University alumni
Pepperdine University alumni
People from Haughton, Louisiana